Sandra Leann James (born July 9, 1990) is an American softball player. She attended Sabine High School in Gladewater, Texas. She later attended Angelo State University for one year, before transferring to Texas Tech University, where she played first base and catcher for the Texas Tech Red Raiders softball team. She holds the single-season record for home runs at both Angelo State and Texas Tech.

References

External links
Texas Tech bio

1990 births
Softball players from Texas
Living people
Sportspeople from Dallas
Texas Tech Red Raiders softball players